Sirens is a 1999 crime-drama TV film starring Dana Delany. It premiered on September 26, 1999, on Showtime Networks.

Plot
Sally Rawlings is a white woman who is making out with Vincent Morgan, her black ex-husband in a parked car when a group of policemen surround the car and murder Vincent. The officers then plant phony evidence at the scene of the crime that would point the blame away from them – Sally knows this is a sham and is determined to find out the truth and bring the cops to justice.

Cast
 Dana Delany as Sally Rawlings
 Keith Carradine as Officer Dan Wexler
 Justin Theroux as Officer David Bontempo
 Vondie Curtis-Hall as Vincent Morgan
 Brian Dennehy as Lieutenant Denby
 Richard Blackburn as Sam Conrad
 Jonathan Whittaker as District Attorney
 Sabrina Grdevich as Sheryl
 Julie Khaner as Fox Hills
 Diego Fuentes as Sylvio
 Karen Glave as Tyus
 James Downing as Waranaco
 Matthew Bennett as Roy Dancer
 Carole Mackereth as Virginia
 Victor Saldivia as Denuncio
 Gloria Slade as Franny
 Bruce Clayton as Meyer
 Lili Francks as Julia Morgan
 Kevin Hare as Hicks
 Michael Mitchell as Vinnie
 Tyson McAuley as Dougy
 Robert B. Kennedy as Fenwick
 Michael Stevens as Freddy
 Von Flores as Assistant Coroner
 Layton Morrison as Transvestite

External links
 

1999 films
1999 television films
1999 crime drama films
American crime drama films
American television films
Films about interracial romance
Films scored by Brian Tyler
1990s American films